Zung Heng Mok, more popularly known as Zung is a photographer from Malaysia.

Personal life 
Zung was born in Sekinchan, Malaysia in 1978.

Career 
Zung has photographed the Prime Minister of Malaysia Mahathir Mohamad and was the photographer for the wedding of Zara Salim Davidson & Raja Nazrin Shah, the Sultan of Perak. He is the personal photographer for Anthony Robbins.

Zung has also shot Donald Trump (California 2012), and Andrea Bocelli (2010).

References

1978 births
Living people
Malaysian photographers